John James Adams (June 14, 1894 – May 1, 1968) was a Canadian professional ice hockey player, coach and general manager in the National Hockey League and Pacific Coast Hockey Association. He played for the Toronto Arenas, Vancouver Millionaires, Toronto St. Patricks and Ottawa Senators between 1917 and 1927. He won the Stanley Cup twice as a player, with Toronto in 1918 and Ottawa in 1927, and was inducted into the Hockey Hall of Fame.

After retiring Adams began a 36-year association with the Detroit Red Wings of the National Hockey League as head coach and as a general manager. He held the record of winningest coach in Red Wings history until 2014. He later became the first president of the Central Professional Hockey League. Adams won the Stanley Cup a further seven times with the Red Wings, and is the only person to have won the Stanley Cup as a player, coach, and general manager.

Playing career
Born in Fort William, Ontario, Jack Adams began his career with the Fort William Maple Leafs in 1914 of the NMHL, and then played for the Calumet Miners a year later. In 1916, he joined the intermediate Peterborough 247th Battalion of the Ontario Hockey Association and the next season moved up to the senior Sarnia Sailors. His younger brother Bill also was a professional hockey player, with the Regina Capitals and the Vancouver Millionaires.

Adams turned pro in 1917 upon joining the Toronto Arenas of the NHL for the 1917–18, earning the reputation as a physical, bruising player. Although he participated in the NHL playoffs, he did not play in any games in the 1918 Stanley Cup Finals against the Vancouver Millionaires when the Torontos won the trophy.

In March 1918 he was drafted into the Canadian military as part of the First World War, and was sent to the United Kingdom in April. He was discharged that November as the war ended, and returned to Canada shortly after.

In December 1919 he was moved west alongside his brother Bill to join the Vancouver Millionaires, where he flourished as a player, leading the league in scoring in 1921–22, when he centred a line with Alf Skinner and Smokey Harris. The February 26, 1922 issue of the Vancouver Sun, commenting on Adams' playing style, complimented him on his strong hands and his ability to shield and hold onto the puck against several checking opponents, as well as his ability to "bore through" the opposing defense. He played in two Stanley Cup series for Vancouver, and was the star of the 1922 series, scoring 6 goals in 5 games.

Coming off that 1921–22 season, he returned east to rejoin the Toronto Arenas, now renamed the Toronto St. Patricks, and played four seasons on a line with right-winger Babe Dye. Adams was the team's leading scorer in 1925–26.

The next season, he joined the Ottawa Senators, finishing his playing career as it began, with a second Stanley Cup championship. His NHL stats included 83 goals, 32 assists in 173 games played.

Adams was inducted into the Hockey Hall of Fame in 1959 as a player.

Coaching and managing career
Soon after his retirement, he became coach and general manager of the second-year Detroit Cougars at the suggestion of NHL president Frank Calder.

At first, the team struggled under his leadership, making the playoffs only two times in his first five years at the helm. A name change to the Detroit Falcons in 1930 did not improve the team's performance. Detroit's fortunes changed in 1932, when Chicago grain merchant James E. Norris bought the Falcons and renamed them the Detroit Red Wings. Norris gave the Red Wings the financing they needed to become an NHL power. Adams led the team to three Stanley Cups before stepping down in 1947 to concentrate on his duties as general manager. His coaching career tallied 413 wins, 390 losses and 161 ties, including a 52–52–1 coaching record in the playoffs. Most of those wins came without a contract; when Norris bought the team he'd torn up Adams' contract and given him a year on his job on probation and a handshake. As it turned out, one year became 15 years. He was the winningest coach in Red Wings history until Mike Babcock passed him late in the 2013-14 season.

By 1947, Adams had built a farm system which produced Alex Delvecchio, Terry Sawchuk, Ted Lindsay, Red Kelly, Sid Abel, and most notably Gordie Howe. It was this core group of players that led the Red Wings to seven straight regular-season first-place finishes from 1948 to 1955, along with four more Cups—making Adams the only man to have his name on the Stanley Cup as a player, coach and general manager.

Adams was known for being wary of letting his teams get complacent, and was not shy about orchestrating blockbuster trades to keep them on their toes—a philosophy which won him the nickname "Trader Jack."  His impulse was slightly restrained after Norris died in 1952 and was succeeded by his daughter, Marguerite Norris. She and Adams never got along very well. While she could have summarily fired Adams since he was still without a contract, she did not do so.

However, Marguerite was forced to turn over control of the team to her younger brother, Bruce Norris, in 1955 after losing an intrafamily struggle. Bruce voiced full confidence in Adams, and the trading resumed anew. During their seven-season run in first place, many thought the Red Wings would rule the league for years to come. However, just days after Bruce took over the presidency, Adams traded away eight players from the 1955 champions. Years later, Howe wrote that Adams' reasoning for the trades still "def(ied) explanation," and argued that the trades opened the door for the Montreal Canadiens to win five Cups in a row (and nine in 14 years). Although the Red Wings remained competitive until the late 1960s, Howe believed the trades "sapped us of the firepower we needed to win another championship."

In 1957, Adams traded Ted Lindsay to Chicago because of union-organizing efforts and had other players affiliated with the effort sent to the minors. As part of the union busting efforts, Adams spread fake rumours attributing Lindsay as criticizing his former teammates. Adams also showed a fake contract to Detroit reporters, claiming Lindsay was being paid $25,000 per year, when he was being paid $12,000.

The efforts resulted in most of the core of this team leaving town and eventually led to Adams being fired in 1963. His 36-year tenure as general manager is the longest in NHL history. He served 31 of those years while still on probation; after 1932 he never signed a contract with the Wings. His ouster from the Red Wings also ended 46 consecutive years at the major-league level in hockey.

Adams had also been involved in an incident in 1942, when he had an outburst due to his belief of biased penalty calling, which led to a fit of rage and ultimately a referee getting punched in game three of the 1942 Stanley Cup Final, thus becoming the first coach to be suspended in a Final.

In 1963, Adams became founding president of the Central Hockey League, a post he held until his death at his desk in 1968.

Career statistics

Regular season and playoffs

Sources:

Coaching record

Awards and achievements
 Won the Stanley Cup as a player with the Toronto Arenas in 1918 and with the Ottawa Senators in 1927.
 Won the Stanley Cup as General Manager and Head Coach of the Detroit Red Wings in 1936, 1937, and 1943.
 Won the Stanley Cup as General Manager of the Detroit Red Wings in 1950, 1952, 1954 and 1955.
 Named in his honour, the Jack Adams Award was introduced in 1974 and is awarded annually to the most outstanding coach in the National Hockey League.
 Was the first recipient of the Lester Patrick Trophy in 1966.
 Inducted into the Hockey Hall of Fame in 1959.
 First All-Star Team Coach in 1937 & 1943.
 Second All-Star Team Coach in 1945.

See also
 List of Detroit Red Wings award winners
 List of Detroit Red Wings seasons

References

References

External links
 

 

1894 births
1968 deaths
Canadian ice hockey centres
Canadian ice hockey coaches
Detroit Red Wings coaches
Detroit Red Wings general managers
Hockey Hall of Fame inductees
Ice hockey people from Ontario
Lester Patrick Trophy recipients
National Hockey League executives
Ontario Hockey Association Senior A League (1890–1979) players
Ottawa Senators (1917) players
Sportspeople from Thunder Bay
Stanley Cup champions
Stanley Cup championship-winning head coaches
Toronto Arenas players
Toronto St. Pats players
Vancouver Millionaires players